Somebody I Used to Know is a 2023 American romantic comedy film directed by Dave Franco and co-written with his wife Alison Brie. The film stars Brie, Jay Ellis and Kiersey Clemons. It was released on Amazon Prime Video on February 10, 2023.

Plot
Ally is the showrunner of a successful, but waning, reality TV series called Dessert Island. After filming the season's final episode, she is informed that the show will be cancelled. With no social life outside work, Ally decides to take a break and visit her mother in Leavenworth, Washington. 

At a bar in her hometown, she runs into an ex-boyfriend, Sean. They spend the night drinking together, and kiss in the car when Sean drops her home. Sean refuses Ally's invitation for sex, and she leaves awkwardly. Later that day, Ally visits Sean's house with the intent to apologize for the incident, but learns that he is getting married that weekend and his family is throwing a party. Ally tries to leave, but Sean's mother Jojo insists she attend the wedding to film it.

Ally learns that Sean's fiancée, Cassidy, is alienated from her parents. She feels suspicious about her, and gets her assistant, Kayla, to dig up information about Cassidy's family. Meanwhile, a streaming platform is interested to renew Dessert Island for another season and wants to interview Ally.

Cassidy is unhappy with Ally's presence at wedding parties. She performs with her punk rock band at a bar, and later shares a table with Ally to talk about Sean. Cassidy tells Ally that she will stop touring with her band to settle down with Sean after marriage. Ally notices that she is unhappy about this. 

Kayla finds information about Cassidy's parents, and Ally asks her to send them an anonymous invitation to the wedding. When Ally and Cassidy spend more time with each other, Ally realizes her impression of her was mistaken. They bond over common interests, even ending up streaking together on a golf course after smoking weed. Sean is distracted by their growing closeness.

On the eve of the wedding, Cassidy is surprised to see her parents. Ally does not confess to inviting them, leading Cassidy to blame Sean for it and call off the wedding. At their hotel, Ally tries to correct her mistake by getting Sean and Cassidy to understand each other better. Sean realizes he is suppressing Cassidy's career and apologizes. Meanwhile, Ally takes the blame for inviting Cassidy's parents, and Cassidy reneges on cancelling the wedding. 

Ally leaves the event permanently and returns to her mother's house, where they have a heart-to-heart about being one's true self. Ally leaves for Los Angeles, but makes a pact to visit more often. Dessert Island is picked up for another season, but Ally passes showrunning duties on to Kayla. She chooses to focus on her interests, picking up another show instead, which centers around the topic of nudism.

Cast

Production
In August 2021, it was announced that Alison Brie, Jay Ellis and Kiersey Clemons had joined the cast of the film, with Dave Franco directing from a screenplay he wrote alongside Brie. Amazon Studios produced and distributed through Prime Video. In September 2021, Julie Hagerty, Haley Joel Osment, Amy Sedaris, Danny Pudi, Zoë Chao, Evan Jonigkeit, Olga Merediz, Ayden Mayeri and Kelvin Yu joined the cast of the film. Franco said the film was inspired by '80s and '90s romantic comedies.

Principal photography began in and around Portland, Oregon in September 2021. In August 2022, Brie stated that post-production had wrapped and the film was finished.

Release
The film was released on February 10, 2023.

Reception
 Metacritic, which uses a weighted average, assigned the film a score of 57 out of 100, based on 18 critics, indicating "mixed or average reviews".

References

External links
 
 

2023 romantic comedy films
2020s American films
2020s English-language films
Amazon Studios films
American romantic comedy films
Black Bear Pictures films
Films about interracial romance
Films about weddings in the United States
Films directed by Dave Franco
Films produced by Wyck Godfrey
Films set in Los Angeles
Films set in Washington (state)
Films shot in Portland, Oregon
Temple Hill Entertainment films